Oluwayomi Bankole Wiekliffe, also known by his nickname Hawk (7 January 1960 – 29 January 2012) was a Nigerian table tennis player. He competed at the 1988 Summer Olympics and the 1992 Summer Olympics.

He died on January 29, 2021.

References

External links
 

1960 births
2012 deaths
Nigerian male table tennis players
Olympic table tennis players of Nigeria
Table tennis players at the 1988 Summer Olympics
Table tennis players at the 1992 Summer Olympics
Place of birth missing